Alloclita paraphracta is a moth in the family Cosmopterigidae. It was described by Edward Meyrick in 1914. It is found in South Africa.

References

Endemic moths of South Africa
Moths described in 1914
Antequerinae
Moths of Africa